The Four-Nations Tournament was an exhibition international football competition which featured national football teams from North America (Caribbean) and South America which was held in April 1944. All matches were played in Willemstad, Curaçao, where four teams played in a round-robin competition at Rif Stadium. The host nation Curaçao emerged as winners of the tournament.

Players
The "Venezuela” national team included four Argentinians (Casco, Mariscotti, Ruíz Díaz and Taiolli) and two Cubans (García Pelayo and Yarritu).

The Haiti national team included notable centerforward Joseph Gaetjens, who would later score for the United States in their 1–0 upset win over England at the 1950 FIFA World Cup.

Rules
Teams earned two points for a win and one point for a tie. Goal difference was the first tiebreaker, than goal average. In case of injury, substitutions were only allowed during the first half and subject to the approval of the opponents’ captain.

Results

Table

References 

1944